is located on the shore of Lake Suwa in Suwa, Nagano Prefecture, Japan. Designed by Shōzō Uchii, it opened in 1995. The collection includes works by Renoir and Chagall, Ogata Kōrin and Sakai Hōitsu, as well as one of the two Japanese National Treasure tea bowls, Fuji-san by Honami Kōetsu.

See also
 List of Cultural Properties of Japan - paintings (Nagano)

References

External links
  Sunritz Hattori Museum of Arts

Museums in Nagano Prefecture
Art museums and galleries in Japan
Art museums established in 1995
1995 establishments in Japan
Suwa, Nagano